Babino is a village in Bobov Dol Municipality, Kyustendil Province, south-western Bulgaria.

References

Villages in Kyustendil Province